Obsess is the debut studio album of Insight 23, released on November 1, 1994 by Fifth Colvmn Records. The album was re-released on May 23, 1995 by Fifth Colvmn Records with an expanded track listing.

Music 
The reissue of Obsess is a multimedia CD-ROM that can be accessed using a computer and plays as white noise on some CD players. The song "Disease" was released on the 1997 various artist compilations Digital Wings 1 and Industrial War: The Agony and the Ecstasy of Industrial Music.

Reception 
Option commended and Obsess said that Insight 23 "represent the new school of electro-rock" Sonic Boom agreed with the comparison for the "Insight 23 has definitely gone out of its way to create a sound almost totally devoid on influences or comparisons" and credited them with being "one of the seemingly few bands who can mix guitars and electronics together and not end up with the guitars washing out all the technology used to create the music."

Track listing

Personnel 
Adapted from the Obsess liner notes.

Insight 23
 Blayne Alexander – vocals, recording and mixing (2, 11)
 Brittain Alexander – percussion, recording and mixing (2, 11)
 John Whatley – guitar, sampler, programming, recording and mixing (2, 11)

Production and design
 Chad Bishop – production, mixing
 Keith Banks – mastering
 Matt Chidgey – engineering, recording and mixing (3-10, 12), additional guitar (10)
 MarkB – cover art, illustrations, design
 Zalman Fishman – executive-production

Release history

References

External links 
 
 
 Obsess at iTunes

1994 debut albums
Fifth Colvmn Records albums